Twoja Wizja was a Polish television station launched on April 1, 1998. The channel was available on the TV platform Wizja TV. The channel presented the programming offer of all channels available on the Wizja TV platform and occasional sports events.

Twoja Wizja ended broadcasting on September 17, 1999. The same day, the channel was replaced by Wizja Sport.

References

External links

Defunct television channels in Poland
Television channels and stations established in 1998
Television channels and stations disestablished in 1999
1998 establishments in Poland
1999 disestablishments in Poland
Polish-language television stations
Mass media in Warsaw